Captain John Edwardes Pugh was a Canadian World War I flying ace credited with five aerial victories.

References

1890 births
1966 deaths
Royal Flying Corps officers
British emigrants to Canada
People from Cheshire West and Chester
Recipients of the Military Cross
Recipients of the Distinguished Flying Cross (United Kingdom)
Military personnel from Cheshire